Sotos syndrome is a rare genetic disorder characterized by excessive physical growth during the first years of life. Excessive growth often starts in infancy and continues into the early teen years. The disorder may be accompanied by autism, mild intellectual disability, delayed motor, cognitive, and social development, hypotonia (low muscle tone), and speech impairments. Children with Sotos syndrome tend to be large at birth and are often taller, heavier, and have relatively large skulls (macrocephaly) than is normal for their age. Signs of the disorder, which vary among individuals, include a disproportionately large skull with a slightly protrusive forehead, large hands and feet, large mandible, hypertelorism (an abnormally increased distance between the eyes), and downslanting eyes. Clumsiness, an awkward gait, and unusual aggressiveness or irritability may also occur.

Although most cases of Sotos syndrome occur sporadically, familial cases have also been reported. It is similar to Weaver syndrome.

Signs and symptoms

This syndrome is characterized by overgrowth and advanced bone age. Affected individuals have dysmorphic features, with macrodolichocephaly, downslanting palpebral fissures and a pointed chin. The facial appearance is most notable in early childhood. Affected infants and children tend to grow quickly; they are significantly taller than their siblings and peers, and have an unusually large skull and large head.

Individuals with Sotos syndrome often have intellectual impairment, and most also display autistic traits. Frequent behavioral impairments include attention deficit hyperactivity disorder (ADHD), phobias, obsessive compulsive disorder, tantrums, and impulsive behaviors (impulse control disorder). Problems with speech and language are also common. Affected individuals may often have stuttering, difficulty with sound production, or a monotone voice. Additionally, weak muscle tone (hypotonia) may delay other aspects of early development, particularly motor skills such as sitting and crawling.

Other signs include scoliosis, seizures, heart or kidney defects, hearing loss, and problems with vision. Some infants with this disorder experience jaundice and poor feeding. A small number of patients with Sotos syndrome have developed cancer, most often in childhood, but no single form of cancer has been associated with this condition. It remains uncertain whether Sotos syndrome increases the risk of specific types of cancer. If persons with this disorder have any increased cancer risk, their risk is only slightly greater than that of the general population.

Genetics

Mutations in the NSD1 gene cause Sotos syndrome. The NSD1 gene provides instructions for making a protein (histone methyltransferase) that is involved in normal growth and development. The function of this protein is unknown, however. In the Japanese population, the most common genetic change leading to Sotos syndrome deletes genetic material from the region of chromosome 5 containing the NSD1 gene. In other populations, small mutations within the NSD1 gene occur more frequently. Genetic changes involving the NSD1 gene prevent one copy of the gene from producing any functional protein. It is unclear how a reduced amount of this protein during development leads to learning disabilities, overgrowth, and the other features of Sotos syndrome.

About 95 percent of Sotos syndrome cases occur by spontaneous mutation. Most of these cases result from new mutations involving the NSD1 gene. A few families have been described with more than one affected family member. These inherited cases enabled researchers to determine that Sotos syndrome has an autosomal dominant pattern of inheritance.

Diagnosis
Diagnosis is based on physical examination, looking for excessive growth among other symptoms. There are no biochemical markers for the disease.

Treatment
Treatment is symptomatic. There is no standard course of treatment for Sotos syndrome.

Prognosis 
Sotos syndrome is not a life-threatening disorder and patients may have a normal life expectancy. Developmental delays may improve in the school-age years; however, coordination problems may persist into adulthood, along with any learning disabilities and/or other physical or mental issues.

Epidemiology
Incidence is approximately 1 in 14,000 births.

See also
 Beckwith-Wiedemann syndrome
 Perlman syndrome
 Proteus syndrome
 Gigantism

References

External links 
 

 

Syndromes
Rare diseases
Genetic diseases and disorders
Syndromes affecting the nervous system